John Frederick Bryan (February 28, 1897July 1, 1966) was a professional football player for the Chicago Cardinals, Chicago Bears, and Milwaukee Badgers. He was also a player-coach and franchise owner of the Badgers in 1925 and 1926.

The Badgers franchise was turned over to Bryan after it was discovered that the team had employed four Chicago high school players for game against the Chicago Cardinals that resulted in a 59-0 loss for the Badgers. As a result of the scandal, owner Ambrose McGuirk was forced by NFL President Joe Carr to turn over his franchise to Bryan.

Under Bryan, the team did manage to win two games in 1926 due to the arrival of end Lavern Dilweg. However Milwaukee dropped out of the NFL after that season.

References

1897 births
1966 deaths
American football running backs
National Football League owners
Chicago Maroons football players
Chicago Cardinals players
Chicago Bears players
Milwaukee Badgers coaches
Milwaukee Badgers players
Sportspeople from Chicago
Players of American football from Chicago